East Grand Forks Senior High School is a public high school in East Grand Forks, Minnesota, United States.

History
A fire in February 1919 completely destroyed the school.

Notable alumni
Dave Thompson, radio host and member of the Minnesota Senate, class of 1980.
Tucker Poolman, hockey player
Kurt Knoff, former NFL football safety

References 
Report Card, Minnesota Department of Education

Public high schools in Minnesota
Schools in Polk County, Minnesota
Greater Grand Forks